Andranik "Andy" Ovassapian (January 27, 1936 – June 17, 2010) was an Iranian-Armenian and American anesthesiologist known for the development and teaching of airway management and tracheal intubation using an optical fiber endoscope. Throughout his career, Ovassapian was a professor at Shiraz University of Medical Sciences, Northwestern University, and the University of Chicago.

Early life and education 
Andranik Ovassapian was born in on January 27, 1936 in Arak, Iran. He studied at the local Armenian school, then at the Araki Pahlav school. In 1961, he completed a medical degree at Shiraz University. Later that year, Ovassapian started a residency and research fellowship at the Namaz Hospital. In 1963, he started a residency and fellowship at the Hospital of the University of Pennsylvania.

Career and research 
After completing his fellowship, Ovassapian taught at University of Pennsylvania for 18 months. In 1968, he returned to the Shiraz University of Medical Sciences as chair of the department of anesthesiology. In the 1970s, Ovassapian used an endoscope to tracheal tubes. In 1974, Ovassapian became the head of the department of anesthesiology at Northwestern University, and in 1983 he became a professor at the same university. In 1998, he moved to the University of Chicago Department of Anesthesiology and Critical Care Department, where he founded the Airway Study and Training Center. In 1988, Ovassapian filed a patent for the technique known as Ovassapian Intubating Airway.

Ovassapian was known for the development and teaching of optical fiber-tracheal intubation.

Personal life 
Ovassapian married Ashghen in 1962. They had one daughter and two sons. He resided in Highland Park, Illinois. Ovassapian died on June 17, 2010 after a stroke in Helsinki where he was attending the European Society of Anaesthesiology annual meeting.

References 

1936 births
2010 deaths
Iranian anesthesiologists
American anesthesiologists
20th-century Iranian physicians
21st-century Iranian physicians
20th-century American physicians
21st-century American physicians
People from Arak, Iran
Shiraz University alumni
Academic staff of Shiraz University
Northwestern University faculty
University of Chicago faculty
Iranian emigrants to the United States
Iranian people of Armenian descent
American people of Armenian descent
American medical researchers
Iranian medical researchers